Centrolepis pilosa is a species of plant in the Restionaceae family and is found in Western Australia.

It blooms between September and October.

It is found in beds of moss in the Wheatbelt, Mid West, Peel, South West and Great Southern regions of Western Australia where it grows in sandy soils over laterite.

References

pilosa
Plants described in 1873
Flora of Western Australia
Poales of Australia